Junnosuke (written: , , ,  or ) is a masculine Japanese given name. Notable people with the name include:

, Japanese businessman and banker
, Japanese musician
Junnosuke Ofusa (1908–1994), Japanese journalist
, Japanese footballer
, Japanese singer-songwriter, actor and model
, Japanese sumo wrestler
, Japanese writer

Japanese masculine given names